SImaw may refer to:

Simaw, Banmauk
Simaw, Shwegu